Jerry May may refer to:
Jerry May (baseball) (1943–1996), American baseball player
Gerald May (1940–2005), known as Jerry, American psychiatrist
Geri Maye, Irish television host

See also
Jerry Mays (disambiguation)